National Route 243 is a national highway of Japan connecting Abashiri, Hokkaidō and Nemuro, Hokkaidō in Japan, with a total length of 173.1 km (107.56 mi).

References

National highways in Japan
Roads in Hokkaido